Raven's Cry is a 1966 novel by Christie Harris and illustrated by Bill Reid. The book tells the tale of how the Haida people and their culture were "pushed to the edge of extinction", through the story of the Eagle chief Albert Edward Edenshaw, uncle of Charles Edenshaw. Harris acknowledged the assistance she received from the anthropologist Wilson Duff.

It won the 1967 Canadian Library Association Book of the Year for Children Award.

References

1966 novels